Rosendin Electric is an employee-owned electrical contractor headquartered in San Jose, California, with more than 6,000 employees nationwide and annual revenues of approximately $2 billion.

Offices are located in San Jose (1964), San Francisco (1972) Sacramento, Anaheim, and, Los Angeles, CA (1983); Tempe, AZ (1994); Baltimore, MD; Las Vegas, NV (2007); Charlotte, NC; Hillsboro and Prineville, OR (1997); Dallas, Fort Worth, Corpus Christi, and Pflugerville, TX; and Sterling, VA (2010).

Employee Stock Ownership
In 1992, the Rosendin family made the decision to sell the company to the employees of Rosendin Electric. By 2000, the sale was complete and Rosendin's employees owned 100% of the company.

History
In 1919, Moses Rosendin began Rosendin Electric Motor Works. The company serviced the Santa Clara/San Jose agricultural community by wiring homes and shops, rewinding motors for wells and pumps and extending pole line facilities for utility companies. The company expanded its business to Central California through the 1920s, The Great Depression, and World War II.

The end of World War II brought rapid commercial and industrial growth to the Santa Clara Valley and expanded work for Rosendin. The company grew from eight employees in the late 30s to ninety employees in the 1950s. In 1953 Rosendin Electric was incorporated as an electrical contractor in the State of California.

In 2000, the Rosendin Electric employees completed their buyout of the Rosendin family, which had begun in the mid '90s, to become the largest employee owned electrical contractor. They are currently the fourth largest electrical contractor in the US.

Rosendin Electric is also involved in design and construction of wind energy plants, including grids and collection systems. Their first wind farm installation was in 2002, and as of 2011 they had completed close to 60 wind farm projects.

On April 12, 2010, Rosendin Electric completed its acquisition of KST Electric, Ltd. ("KST"), a Texas-based, privately held, full service electrical, data and communication contracting company based out of Manor, Texas with regional offices in Dallas, Houston, San Antonio, Corpus Christi and Harlingen. With the acquisition, Rosendin Electric gained immediate access to the Texas construction market. In December 2013, Rosendin Electric announced that KST Electric would assume its new name as Rosendin Electric.

References

Companies based in San Jose, California
Construction and civil engineering companies established in 1919
Engineering companies of the United States
Employee-owned companies of the United States
1919 establishments in California